Puerto Suello Tunnel is a rail tunnel in San Rafael, California.

The tunnel was partially destroyed in 1961 by a fire, which was set by two boys. The fire killed 23-year-old firefighter Frank Kinsler when his truck fell 50 feet into the chasm. It was rebuilt for freight service in 1967, but was closed and boarded up in 1985 with the discontinuation of Northwestern Pacific Railroad services. The state-owned North Coast Railroad Authority and the Golden Gate Bridge, Highway and Transportation District took ownership of the tunnel in the 1970s and was thereafter acquired by SMART in 2003.

It was retrofitted by SMART for a cost of $3 million in 2015. The 2017 California floods caused damage to the tunnel, delaying system's opening testing for three weeks.

References

Railroad tunnels in California
Tunnels completed in 1879
1879 establishments in California
Public transportation in the San Francisco Bay Area
Tunnels in the San Francisco Bay Area
Sonoma-Marin Area Rail Transit
Transportation buildings and structures in Marin County, California
Tunnels completed in 2017
Underground commuter rail